Parliamentary elections were held in Somalia on 30 December 1979. The elections were the first since 1969 and the first to be held under the new constitution approved in a referendum held in August, which had made the country a one-party state. As a result, the Somali Revolutionary Socialist Party (SRSP) was the only party to participate in the election, with voters being asked to vote yes or no to a single list of 171 candidates. A reported 99.95% of voters ultimately approved the list. The Assembly elected Siad Barre as President, who then nominated a further six members to the Assembly.

Results

References

Somalia
1979 in Somalia
Elections in Somalia
One-party elections
Single-candidate elections
December 1979 events in Africa
Election and referendum articles with incomplete results